Tsvetelina Naydenova (born ) is a Bulgarian group rhythmic gymnast.

Career 
She represented her nation at international competitions. She participated at the 2012 Summer Olympics. She also competed at world championships, including at the 2015 World Rhythmic Gymnastics Championships where she won a silver and a bronze medal.

Naydenova was member of the Bulgarian group that competed at the 2016 Summer Olympics in Rio de Janeiro, Brazil. (Together with Lyubomira Kazanova, Mihaela Maevska, Reneta Kamberova, Hristiana Todorova), they won the Group All-around bronze medal. They dedicated their medal to their teammate Tsvetelina Stoyanova, whom attempted to commit suicide and fell from her apartment in Sofia.

Detailed Olympic results

References

External links
 
 RhythmicGymnasticsResults.com

1994 births
Living people
Bulgarian rhythmic gymnasts
Place of birth missing (living people)
Gymnasts at the 2012 Summer Olympics
Gymnasts at the 2016 Summer Olympics
Olympic gymnasts of Bulgaria
European Games competitors for Bulgaria
Gymnasts at the 2015 European Games
Medalists at the Rhythmic Gymnastics European Championships
Medalists at the Rhythmic Gymnastics World Championships
Olympic bronze medalists for Bulgaria
Medalists at the 2016 Summer Olympics
Olympic medalists in gymnastics